Graduated Fool is the third studio album from Dutch singer Anouk, released on 22 November 2002. The album yielded three singles: "Everything" peaked at number 12 in the Dutch top 40, second single "I Live For You" failed to chart and third single "Hail" peaked at number 31, due to a lack of promotion because Anouk was pregnant with her son Elijah. The album itself peaked at number 3 in the Dutch album chart. With 25.000 copies sold, it was her least successful album to date.

Track list
"Too Long" – 3:55
"Everything" – 4:24
"Hail" – 3:53
"Who Cares" – 4:37
"Graduated Fool" – 3:52
"Stop Thinking" – 4:18
"No Time To Waste" – 3:57
"Searching" – 3:54
"Margarita Chum" – 4:19
"I Live For You" – 3:40
"Bigger Side" – 4:41

Personnel
Bass – Michel van Schie 
Drums – Hans Eijkenaar 
Electric Guitar – Leendert Haaksma, Lex Bolderdijk (tracks: 2, 4), René van Barneveld 
Engineer – Holger Schwedt, John Sonneveld 
Mastered By – Greg Calbi 
Mixed By – Michael H. Brauer 
Mixed By [Assistant] – Nathaniel Chan, Ricardo Chavarria
Photography By – Allard Honigh, Frans Jansen (3) 
Producer – Anouk 
Written-By – A. Teeuwe (tracks: 1 to 10), B. van Veen (tracks: 1 to 10)

Charts

Weekly charts

Year-end charts

References

2002 albums
Anouk (singer) albums